Lagorara is an Italian surname. Notable people with the surname include:

Elena Lagorara (born 1939), Italian Olympic gymnast
Luciana Lagorara (born 1936), Italian Olympic gymnast, sister of Elena

Italian-language surnames